Thiago Teixeira Simon (born April 3, 1990 in Penápolis) is a Brazilian swimmer.

International career

2014–16

At the 2014 South American Games in Santiago, Chile, Simon won a silver medal in the 200-metre individual medley, and a bronze medal in the 400-metre individual medley.

At the 2014 José Finkel Trophy in Guaratinguetá, Simon broke the short-course South American record in the 200-metre breaststroke, with a time of 2:04.28.

At the 2015 Pan American Games in Toronto, Canada, Simon won a gold medal in the 200 metre breaststroke, with a time of 2:09.82, new Pan American Games record. He also won a gold medal in the 4×200-metre freestyle relay, by participating at heats.

At the 2015 World Aquatics Championships in Kazan, Simon finished 29th in the Men's 200 metre breaststroke

2016 Summer Olympics
At the 2016 Summer Olympics, he competed in the Men's 200-metre breaststroke, finishing in 36th place overall in the heats.

2016-20
On 13 September 2016, at the José Finkel Trophy (short-course competition), he broke the South American record in the 200-metre breaststroke, with a time of 2:02.58.

At the 2016 FINA World Swimming Championships (25 m) in Windsor, Ontario, Canada, he finished 9th in the Men's 200 metre breaststroke, and 13th in the Men's 200 metre individual medley.

At the 2017 World Aquatics Championships in Budapest, he finished 19th in the Men's 200 metre individual medley and 26th in the Men's 200 metre breaststroke.

References

Brazilian male medley swimmers
1990 births
Living people
Brazilian male breaststroke swimmers
Swimmers at the 2015 Pan American Games
Pan American Games gold medalists for Brazil
Swimmers at the 2016 Summer Olympics
Olympic swimmers of Brazil
Pan American Games medalists in swimming
South American Games silver medalists for Brazil
South American Games bronze medalists for Brazil
South American Games medalists in swimming
Competitors at the 2014 South American Games
Medalists at the 2015 Pan American Games
Sportspeople from São Paulo (state)
21st-century Brazilian people
People from Penápolis